Actualite.cd is a Congolese media website specializing in political, security and economic information. It was launched in 2016 as part of Groupe Next Corp.

Overview
Actualite.cd was created following the impromptu closure of Politico.cd, another political news website in the Democratic Republic of Congo. The website was launched on August 4, 2016, by the journalist Patient Ligodi, co-founder of Politico, with the aim of making a site more powerful, captivating, more responsive and more complete. It mainly deals with three headings, of which it is about politics, economy and security.

The media employs more than fifty journalists covering the news throughout the Congolese territory and is the ninth most visited website in Democratic Republic of Congo according to Alexa Internet

Famous journalists
 Patient Ligodi : 2017 UNESCO/Guillermo Cano World Press Freedom Prize and Director of the Univers FM radio station
 Pascal Mulegwa : RFI and Agence France-Presse correspondent in the Democratic Republic of the Congo
 Prisca Lokale : 2019 JDH Prize (Journalists for Human Rights Prize)
 Stanis Bujakera Tshiamala : 2019 Patriotism gold medal by the New Dynamics of Civil Society
 Ange Kasongo : Writer and RFI and Agence France-Presse correspondent, author of the novel Les Femmes de Pakadjuma

References

External links

 
 
 

Mass media companies of the Democratic Republic of the Congo
Companies based in Kinshasa
French-language websites
Internet properties established in 2016